The siege of Tayabas was a 2-month campaign of the Philippine Revolution that saw intense guerrilla warfare and bloodshed for the province. The battle occurred shortly after Aguinaldo's return from Hong Kong in May of the same year. Tayabas was just one of the many triumphs for the revolutionaries in that year, leading up to Philippine independence.

Background 
On December 14, 1897, Emilio Aguinaldo and Gov. Gen. Primo de Rivera signed the Pact of Biak-na-Bato ending the first phase of the Philippine revolution. However, many Generals of the revolution, Like Paciano Rizal and Miguel Malvar, rejected the pact and continued the fight against Spain. Malvar took command of the disoriented and disillusioned forces of the southern provinces of Batangas, Tayabas and Laguna together with Rizal, but in the end, he rounded up his followers and left for Hong Kong together with other key revolutionaries. In mid-May, 1898, Aguinaldo returned and defeated the Spaniards at Alapan While Malvar came shortly after, gathering once again, an army from Batangas, Aguinaldo appointed him Division General and tasked him to liberate the province of Tayabas and Batangas from the remaining Spaniards there.

The Battle 
The actual start of hostilities in Tayabas is put around 15 June 1898, when Malvar assembled his "Batangas Brigade" and crossed the border to Tayabas province. The battle was said to have raged on for 2 months, mostly intense guerrilla warfare and jungle fighting, the casualties mounted and slowly, the battle was dragging into a stalemate as June drew near. Both sides were well armed, with the Batanguenos freshly supplied with new weapons and ammunition from Aguinaldo's army in Cavite, with a steady supply of ammo and men, Malvar's forces in Tayabas began to slowly wrestle the province from the Spaniards. Similar events were occurring in Laguna, with Paciano Rizal cornering the Spaniards in Calamba, and Gregorio del Pilar occupying Bulacan and Nueva Ecija. Slowly, the Spanish war effort was being depleted, after hearing of the terrible news from all around, and crippled by Malaria and dysentery, The depleted Spaniards surrendered to Malvar on August 15, 1898. Although Malvar's main army was armed with Mausers and other modern weaponry, numerous Tayabeño katipuneros who joined the fighting were armed with simple Knives and spears; however, the advantage of the Spaniards in terms of weaponry was relatively neutralized due to the close up fighting in the jungles and foothills of Mt. Banahaw in Tayabas.

Legacy 
The victory in Tayabas, was, unfortunately, short-lived. Malvar and his men could only celebrate for a while before facing another enemy in the form of the Americans, Malvar was to fight an even more challenging war than with the Spaniards, and eventually emerging as one of the last generals to surrender to the Americans in 1902.

References 
 Miguel Malvar shrine, Sto. Tomas, Batangas. 
 Miguel Malvar Museum. 
 Batangas-Philippines.com on Miguel Malvar. 
 Philippine History group of Los Angeles: Miguel Malvar, The Last holdout 

Battles of the Philippine Revolution
History of Quezon